Justine Henin-Hardenne was the defending champion, but chose not to participate that year.

Amélie Mauresmo won in the final 6–1, 6–0, against Elena Likhovtseva.

Seeds
The top eight seeds received a bye into the second round. 

  Serena Williams (withdrew due to a left knee inflammation)
  Amélie Mauresmo (champion)
  Anastasia Myskina (semifinals)
  Elena Dementieva (second round)
  Jennifer Capriati (quarterfinals)
  Maria Sharapova (third round)
  Ai Sugiyama (third round)
  Nadia Petrova (second round)
  Paola Suárez (third round)
  Vera Zvonareva (semifinals)
  Francesca Schiavone (third round)
  Karolina Šprem (quarterfinals)
  Magdalena Maleeva (quarterfinals)
  Elena Bovina (third round)
  Chanda Rubin (third round)
  Fabiola Zuluaga (second round)
  Mary Pierce (third round)

Draw

Finals

Top half

Section 1

Section 2

Bottom half

Section 3

Section 4

External links
Draw and Qualifying Draw

2004 Canada Masters and the Rogers AT&T Cup